Ang.: Lone is a 1970 Danish drama film directed by Franz Ernst. It was entered into the 21st Berlin International Film Festival where it won a Special Recognition award. The film was also selected as the Danish entry for the Best Foreign Language Film at the 43rd Academy Awards, but was not accepted as a nominee.

Cast
 Pernille Kløvedal as Lone
 Margit Iversen as Margit
 Steen Kaalø as Niels
 Peter Engberg as Chauffør I jeep
 Katrine Jensenius as Margits veninde
 Kim Larsen as Ven til Margits veninde
 Leif Mønsted as Kvaksalver
 Flemming Dyjak as Drager
 Lisbet Lundquist
 Gitte Reingaard
 Niels Schwalbe
 Elinor Brungaard

See also
 List of submissions to the 43rd Academy Awards for Best Foreign Language Film
 List of Danish submissions for the Academy Award for Best Foreign Language Film

References

External links

 

1970 films
1970 drama films
1970s Danish-language films
Danish black-and-white films
Films directed by Franz Ernst
Danish drama films
Best Danish Film Bodil Award winners